Mlądz may refer to the following places in Poland:
Mlądz in Gmina Mirsk, Lwówek Śląski County in Lower Silesian Voivodeship (SW Poland)
Other places called Mlądz (listed in Polish Wikipedia)